Hotel Elfie is a German television series.

See also
Girl friends – Freundschaft mit Herz
List of German television series

External links
 

2000 German television series debuts
2000 German television series endings
German-language television shows
German television spin-offs
ZDF original programming